Ekeland is a surname. Notable people with the surname include:

Arne Ekeland (1908–1994), Norwegian painter
Ivar Ekeland (born 1944), French mathematician of Norwegian descent
Jostein Ekeland (born 1997), Norwegian footballer
Tor Ekeland (born 1969), American lawyer

See also
Ekelund